The Adolescent and Children's Trust (TACT) is the largest charity providing fostering and adoption services across the United Kingdom. The charity works in twelve offices across England, Wales and Scotland. As well as providing fostering or adoptive families for children, TACT campaigns on behalf of children and young people in care, carers, their families and adoptive families across the UK.

History
TACT was set up in 1992 in response to changes in child care policy. Instead of local authorities placing children in their care in residential homes, increasing priority was placed on offering family based care to a much wider range of children and young people. This was consistent with the rapidly emerging philosophy of providing care close to children's own family, school and social contacts.

These rapid changes made it difficult for local authorities to meet the increasing need to provide foster care and adoptive placements and it was a concern for the lack of adequate provision which led to a group of local authority service managers, who were also qualified and experienced social workers to create TACT. The organisation was subsequently registered as a charity ensuring that any surplus income was reinvested in meeting the needs of looked after children placed with TACT.

TACT became an adoption agency in 2004 and expanded its size by joining together with the Independent Adoption Services (IAS) in 2007, Parents for Children (PfC) in 2009 and most recently with Supported Fostering Services (SFS) in 2019.

In June 2012 TV chef and bestselling cookery writer Lorraine Pascale became TACT's first celebrity patron.

Partnerships and affiliations
TACT is a founding member of Fostering Through Social Enterprise (FtSE), a consortium of voluntary and non profit fostering agencies that advocate for children in respect of regulation, as well as representing its membership at central government level.

References
England and Wales' Charity Commission website
TACT voted one of The Sunday Times 100 Best Small Companies to Work For

External links
The Adolescent and Children's Trust's Website

Children's charities based in the United Kingdom
Charities based in London
Children's charities based in England
Adoption-related organizations
Organizations established in 1993
1993 establishments in the United Kingdom
Adoption in the United Kingdom
Foster care in the United Kingdom